Women & Songs 3 is the third album in the Women & Songs franchise.

Overview
The album was released on November 30, 1999 featuring 18 tracks from music's best women artists.  The album peaked at #4 on the Top Canadian Album charts.

The first of many upcoming bonus releases was also released the same day.  Women & Songs: Beginnings also debuted with Women & Songs 3.

Track listing
 Thank U (Glen Ballard/Alanis Morissette) [4:18]
(performed by Alanis Morissette)
 Frozen - Edit (Patrick Leonard/Madonna) [5:09]
(performed by Madonna)
 Believe (Paul Barry/Matthew Gray/Brian Higgins/Stuart McLennan/Timothy Powell/Steve Torch) [3:59]
(performed by Cher)
 I Believe in Love (Paula Cole) [4:11]
(performed by the Paula Cole Band)
 Why (Annie Lennox) [4:54]
(performed by Annie Lennox)
 Hands (Jewel Kilcher/Patrick Leonard) [3:52]
(performed by Jewel)
 Kiss Me (Matt Slocum) [3:28]
(performed by Sixpence None The Richer)
 Adia (Pierre Marchand/Sarah McLachlan) [4:03]
(performed by Sarah McLachlan)
 My Favorite Mistake (Sheryl Crow/Jeff Trott) [4:05]
(performed by Sheryl Crow)
 Adam's Rib - Soft Remix (Melanie Doane/Rick Neigher) [3:11]
(performed by Melanie Doane)
 Insensitive (Ann Loree) [4:15]
(performed by Jann Arden)
 12 Years Old - Edit (Abenaa Frempong/Kim Stockwood/Peter-John Vettese) [4:30]
(performed by Kim Stockwood)
 Linger (Noel Hogan/D. O'Riordan) [4:35]
(performed by The Cranberries)
 Wrong to Let You Go (Robert Michaels/Wild Strawberries) [4:16]
(performed by Wild Strawberries and Robert Michaels)
 Break Your Heart (Natalie Merchant) [4:47]
(performed by Natalie Merchant)
 Imperfect Girl (Narlock/Popowitz/Taylor Rhodes) [3:35]
(performed by Yve N. Adam)
 Let Me Let Go - Pop Remix (Steve Diamond/Dennis Morgan) [4:23]
(performed by Faith Hill)
 In My Hands - Album Version Edit (Natalie MacMaster/Gordie Sampson/Amy Sky) [3:36]
(performed by Natalie MacMaster)

References
 [ Women & Songs 3 at AllMusic]

1999 compilation albums